Milena Tůmová is a former ice dancer who competed for Czechoslovakia. With Josef Pešek, she became a three-time national medalist and competed at four ISU Championships. The duo finished in the top ten at the 1968 European Championships in Västerås, Sweden, and 1969 European Championships in Garmisch-Partenkirchen, West Germany. They placed 12th at the 1968 World Championships in Geneva, Switzerland. They represented Prague.

Competitive highlights 
(with Pešek)

References 

Czechoslovak female ice dancers
Living people
Figure skaters from Prague
Year of birth missing (living people)